Sir Victor Alfred Charles Turner, CSI, CIE, MBE, SI (12 March 1892 – 16 October 1974) was an English-Pakistani civil service officer, statistician and economist, and one of the founding fathers of the Civil Service of Pakistan, serving as the first Finance Secretary of Pakistan in the government of Prime Minister Liaquat Ali Khan, as well as Chairman of the Central Board of Revenue from 14 August 1947 until 1 February 1950.

Alfred Charles Turner – in 1947, when he was knighted, he added the name 'Victor' – was born at 36, Campden Street, Kensington, England on 12 March 1892 to Walter Charles Turner, a butler, and his wife Annie formerly Searle. His older brothers were Walter Edward Neal Turner, born 1886, and Robert Henry Turner, born 1889. Alfred's early education was at St Mary Abbots Higher Grade School, Kensington 1896–1904 and then he attended Latymer Upper School, Hammersmith 1905–1911. In the autumn of 1911 he went up to Emmanuel College, Cambridge on an Open Scholarship to read Mathematics. He gained a 'First' in Part 1 of the Maths Tripos in 1912 and in Part 2 was Wrangler in 1914. He was awarded his BA in 1914 and his MA in 1918.

Military career

During the First World War Alfred Charles served with the Royal Fusiliers as Lieutenant, and fought in France from 9 August 1915. He then became Inspector of Propellent Explosives at the Woolwich Arsenal with the rank of captain. In 1921 he applied for and was awarded the 1914/15 Star, British War and Victory medals. His address at the time of his medal application was Sitapur, Gorakhpur, United Provinces, India.

Indian Civil Service

Turner joined the Indian Civil Service in 1919 (he was posted to Lucknow as an assistant commissioner) and went out to what is now Uttar Pradesh in 1920. Between 1926 and 1929 he was involved with the resettlement of the Rae Bareli district and in 1930 was given responsibility for the organisation of the 1931 census of Uttar Pradesh. His undoubted skill as an administrator led to his appointment as Revenue Secretary to the Provincial Government in 1935 and was made Financial Secretary in 1936. In 1941, he rose to become Additional Secretary in the Indian Government in Delhi, was Financial Commissioner for Railways in late 1945 and returned to the Finance Department as Principal Secretary in early 1947.

Pakistan

After the establishment of Pakistan, Sir Victor Turner was the first finance secretary as well as the first Christian to be appointed to one of the key administrative posts, by the Prime Minister, Liaquat Ali Khan. He took an active role in the Pakistan Movement and was one of the main Christian leaders in the movement.

Soon after being appointed, Turner became the first person to head the Federal Bureau of Statistics, and was asked by the Prime Minister to re-organize the government departments and financial institutions. Turner succeeded in establishing the installation of a paper currency mill, with the help of De La Rue plc., printing the first official rupee which carries his own signature, V.A.C. Turner. Sir Victor made several reforms in the Pakistan Civil Service, submitting a report to the Prime Minister with recommendations about the size of the Civil Service and high-lighting existing deficiencies in various ministries. After the assassination of Prime Minister Liaquat Ali Khan, Turner was removed from the government and he moved back to the United Kingdom to take up an appointment as the financial adviser to the High Commissioner of Pakistan in London. He also served as the first Treasurer of the newly founded, UK-based Pakistan Society until 1969

Later life

After leaving Pakistan, Sir Victor continued to visit it, advising the government on various economic issues. Because of his extensive contributions, the government of Pakistan conferred on him the Sitara-e-Imtiaz. In 1954 he was appointed as an economic adviser to Thomas De La Rue and Co.Ltd., and he retired in 1964. Sir Victor Turner died on 16 October 1974 in Surrey, England, aged 82 and was survived by his widow Winifred Bessie formerly Howarth whom he married in 1957. He also left a daughter by his first marriage, Joan Goodall (taking her step-father's surname, married name Bond), in 1916 to Gladys Olive Alice Sindall and a son and a daughter by his second marriage to Gladys Blanche Hoskins in 1927.

Honours

Knighthood – 1947.
Companion of the Order of the Indian Empire (CIE).
Companion of the Order of the Star of India (CSI).
Member of the Most Excellent Order of the British Empire (MBE).
Sitara-e-Imtiaz.

References

See also
Pakistan Movement
Planning Commission
Pakistan–United Kingdom relations
British Raj

1892 births
1974 deaths
Knights Bachelor
Leaders of the Pakistan Movement
First Pakistani Cabinet
English expatriates in Pakistan
English emigrants to Pakistan
Naturalised citizens of Pakistan
English statisticians
English economists
English knights
Finance Secretaries of Pakistan
Pakistani statisticians
Pakistani economists
Pakistani civil servants
Pakistani Christians
British currency designers
Royal Fusiliers officers
British civil servants
Indian Civil Service (British India) officers
Companions of the Order of the Indian Empire
Companions of the Order of the Star of India
Pakistani Members of the Order of the British Empire
Recipients of Sitara-i-Imtiaz